Germani is an Italian surname. Notable people with the surname include:

Fernando Germani (1906–1998), Italian organist 
 Gaia Germani (born 1942), Italian film and television actress 
Remo Germani (1938–2010), Italian singer 

Italian-language surnames